Yvonne Canu (1921–2008) was a French painter, considered part of Neo-Impressionism, who used the techniques of pointillism in her works.

She was born to French parents in Meknes in Morocco in 1921. She began her studies at the École des Arts Décoratifs in Paris, but they were interrupted by World War II.

The future pointillist met with artists such as Élisée Maclet and Tsuguharu Foujita, who introduced her to landscape painting and the principles of impressionism. Later attended the Academie de la Grand Chaumiere alongside Ossip Zadkine.

Yvonne Canu began to present her works after the end of the World War II, but it was only in 1955 that she finally came to neo-impressionism. Cañu made this decision under the impression of the painting "Un dimanche après-midi à l'le de la Grande Jatte" by Georges Seurat, one of the pioneers of this trend. In this direction (pointillism) she worked the most part of the life, up to the death in 2008.

References 

1921 births
2008 deaths
French women painters
20th-century French painters
Modern painters
20th-century French women artists
Place of death missing
Date of death missing
People from Meknes
Post-impressionist painters